Inwa Mibaya (1534–1595) was the chief queen consort of Ava from 1555 to 1584. She was the eldest child of King Bayinnaung and his chief queen Atula Thiri Maha Yaza Dewi of Toungoo Dynasty of Burma (Myanmar). At age 20, she was married off to Bayinnaung's younger half-brother Thado Minsaw, at the latter's coronation ceremony as viceroy of Ava on 19 February 1555. The couple had a daughter, Natshin Medaw.

The Burmese chronicles name her as an instigator for her husband's 1583 rebellion against her younger brother King Nanda. But Nanda held no grudge toward his elder sister. After he put down Thado Minsaw's rebellion in April 1584, he put her up at a mansion at Pegu, replete with her retinue. In mid-1587, Natshin Medaw joined her at her residence after her daughter was divorced by Mingyi Swa. The dowager queen peacefully lived out her last years with her daughter, and died in January 1595 at age 60. She was given a royal cremation ceremony by her brother.

Ancestry

Notes

References

Bibliography
 
 

Queens consort of Toungoo dynasty
1534 births
1595 deaths
16th-century Burmese women